Momen Atef (born November 12, 1994) is an Egyptian professional footballer who plays as a right back for the Egyptian club Al Nasr. After his loan to Aswan ended, he signed a 2-year contract for Aswan.

References

External links
 Momen Atef at KOOORA.com

1994 births
Living people
Al Nasr SC (Egypt) players
Egyptian footballers
Association football defenders